Quitchupah (or Quitchumpah) Creek is a stream draining portions of Emery and Sevier Counties in central Utah, in the western United States. Quitchupah Creek is significant for rock art remains of the Fremont culture that line its banks.  Quitchupah is Ute for "animals fare poorly." The drainage area is located within the Colorado River Basin near the south end of the Wasatch Plateau. All drainage from the area flows to Quitchupah Creek or its tributaries, including East Spring Canyon, Water Hollow, and North Fork and flows through Convulsion Canyon.

It exits Convulsion Canyon and crosses under Utah State Route 10, south of the town of Emery, and then flows southeasterly and intersects with Ivie Creek, which ultimately merges with Muddy Creek and passing the Hidden Splendor Mine area, it passes through the San Rafael Reef at the Muddy Creek Gorge. Finally, after an estimated length of 100 miles (160 km) and a drop of 6000 feet (1825 m), it combines with the Fremont River to form the Dirty Devil River just north of the town of Hanksville.
The Old Spanish Trail crossed Quitchupah Creek. Mormon settlers moved along its banks in the 1880s, but the settlement was later abandoned. Quitchupah Creek was recently in the news for a proposed road along the creek from Convulsion Canyon coal mines to Utah State Route 10.

See also
List of rivers of Utah

References

External links
 Emery County Official Website
 Quitchupah Creek Road Project - US Forest Service
 Emery County Travel website

Rivers of Utah
Rivers of Emery County, Utah
San Rafael Swell